Matthew Graham is a British television writer, and the co-creator of the BBC/Kudos Film and Television science fiction series Life on Mars, which debuted in 2006 on BBC One and has received international critical acclaim.

Career
Graham began his career writing for the soap opera EastEnders and the children's drama Byker Grove, both for BBC One. In the 1990s, he wrote for the popular BBC Two drama series This Life, and created and wrote the post-apocalyptic drama serial The Last Train for ITV. He has also written episodes for Spooks and Hustle, and he wrote "Fear Her", an episode of the 2006 series of Doctor Who.

Ashes to Ashes, a Life on Mars sequel which he co-created with Life on Mars writer/co-creator Ashley Pharoah, was first broadcast on BBC One on 8 January 2008, to an audience of 7 million, according to overnight figures. In the US, ABC commissioned a remake of Life on Mars, also to be called Life on Mars, developed by David E. Kelley, creator of Ally McBeal, for broadcast in the 2007/08 midseason.

In 2006, Graham formed Monastic Productions with Pharoah (co-creator of Life on Mars). Monastic Productions are involved in the Life on Mars spin-off Ashes to Ashes, as well as in co-producing Bonekickers, a 6-part drama series about archaeology set in Bath. Both series are productions for BBC One. Bonekickers was not renewed after the first series, but Ashes to Ashes completed its third and final series in May 2010.

In November 2010, Graham announced the production of a new television series co-created with Pharoah for ITV. Eternal Law tells the story of two angels who are sent to Earth to assist in the salvation of mankind as lawyers in a York law firm. He also confirmed that he would be returning to the world of Doctor Who in 2011, writing the fifth and sixth episodes of the sixth series, a two-part story entitled "The Rebel Flesh" and "The Almost People".

His adaptation of the novel Childhood's End aired on Syfy in December 2015.

He wrote “The Hood Maker”, the first episode in the Channel 4/Amazon Video series Philip K. Dick's Electric Dreams, which first aired in September 2017.

Writing credits

Awards and nominations

References

External links
 
 
 Radio Wiltshire interview with Matthew Graham
 Participant in the Café of Ideas creative community based in Bath, UK
http://www.telegraph.co.uk/culture/tvandradio/8115817/Screenwriters-clash-over-state-of-TV-drama.html
Matthew Graham Interview with Best British TV

Place of birth missing (living people)
Year of birth missing (living people)
Living people
British soap opera writers
British television writers
English television writers
English screenwriters
English male screenwriters
English soap opera writers
British male television writers